Krzywicki (feminine: Krzywicka; plural: Krzywiccy) is a Polish surname. It comes from toponyms such as Krzywica and Krzywice, both derived from the adjective krzywy.

It may refer to:
 Dick Krzywicki (born 1947), Welsh footballer
 Irena Krzywicka (1899–1994), Polish feminist
 Ludwik Krzywicki (1859–1941), Polish sociologist
 Marcin Krzywicki (born 1986), Polish footballer
 Piotr Krzywicki (1964–2009), Polish politician

See also

References

Polish-language surnames